Bright Green Field is the debut studio album by British band Squid. The album was released on 7 May 2021 through Warp Records.

Background and recording 
Recorded throughout 2020, the album was produced by Dan Carey, who had been associated with many of the band's affiliated acts, including Black Midi, Fontaines D.C., and Black Country, New Road.

In an interview with Exclaim!, frontman Ollie Judge stated that the record's tracks "illustrate the places, events, and architecture that exist within (the album). Previous releases were playful and concerned with characters, whereas this album is darker and more concerned with the place — the emotional depth of the music has deepened."

Release and promotion

Singles 
The band signed with Warp Records in March 2020 and, later that spring, released two standalone singles with the label, "Sludge" and "Broadcaster". In January 2021 the lead single off the album, "Narrator", was released, which corresponded with the album's announcement. According to the band, there was an extensive list of recordings undertaken for the production and mastering of the album, including a 30-person choir, a horn and string ensemble, and field recordings of bees.

Music videos 
On 27 January 2021, the corresponding music video for the lead single "Narrator" was released. The music video was directed by Felix Geen and features the band playing in a broken 3D-rendered space. Geen said that he "wanted to make a video about the virtual creation process. For example, showing the components and processes behind virtual environment construction and looking closely at those small rocks, pieces of terrain and chunks of regolith that slot together to build something bigger. I often think this 'behind the digital curtain' part of 3D design looks more interesting than the final finished product since it conveys a process and an authorship". On 18 May 2021, a music video for the album's third single, "Pamphlets", was premiered and released on the band's YouTube channel. It was created and directed by Raman Djafari, while Barney Abrahams did the rigging and character animation. Of the video, the band stated that "when planning the music videos for the album, we wanted to make sure we covered a few different mediums, so we're super happy to have a freaky animation crossed off the list."

Critical reception

Bright Green Field received widespread acclaim from critics. At Metacritic, which assigns a normalized rating out of 100 to reviews from mainstream publications, the album received a weighted average score of 89, based on 19 reviews, indicating "universal acclaim".

NME gave the album a perfect-score rave review, with Will Richards calling it "[a]n uncompromising debut that fulfils every ounce of the band’s potential". He wrote that "(across) the album, which tops 50-minutes in length, the band veer between genres, styles and moods with abandon, mirroring the frightening, ever-changing political and cultural landscape it was created in." In another perfect-score review, Alice Jenner of The Line of Best Fit hailed the album as "a debut for the ages" and praised its "perfect blend of calm and chaos [...] they stitch together moments of quintessential jazz and soul harmony with cacophonous punk impulse."

US publications like Paste found that the band's "utter disregard for rock convention elevates Bright Green Field’s paranoid, vaguely dystopian universe". Timothy Monger of AllMusic called the "much-anticipated debut album" an "energetic shouting match of vivid new wave, Krautrock, and post-punk influences". He went on to note that "[i]n some ways, their debut carries the absurdist lineage [of] 'Houseplants' and 'The Cleaner', two of the Squid's [sic] best-known singles, though it's also clearly its own monster. Like an avalanche gathering up everything in its path, Squid seem to thrive on evolution and an inherent sense of danger." He concluded that as "(truly) a band for the times, Squid feels like a wild jumble of thoughts come to life, effusing anger, confusion, humor, detachment, and even joyfulness in their pursuit of true creative freedom." Meanwhile, Mojos Andrew Perry called the album a "thrilling post-punk/Krautrock collision", also directing praise toward Carey's production and Judge's vocals.

A mixed review came from The Skinny whose Tony Inglis called the group "the guitar boys' buzz band of the moment". He noted that the album "follows in the footsteps of their best track The Cleaner – supercharging the banal and mundane with vigour and purpose – it rips, mixing genres like straight-ahead indie-rock with funk and jazz, and exploring ambient and textural backdrops which make their now-home Warp apt." Writing for The Observer, Emily Mackay was also critical of the album, claiming that "Nothing here is truly experimental or innovative – it’s more the kind of music that gets labelled as such because of the influences it shows."

Accolades

Track listing

Personnel 
Ollie Judge – lead vocals, drums 
Louis Borlase – guitar, bass guitar, vocals
Arthur Leadbetter – keyboards, cello, percussion
Laurie Nankivell – bass guitar, cornet, percussion
Anton Pearson – guitar, bass, vocals, percussion
Nataly Corolscaia – violin
Lewis Evans – alto saxophone
Georgia Hannington – cello
Charlie Keen – trombone 
Yulia Knowles – viola
Emma-Jean Thackray – trumpet

Charts

References 

2021 debut albums
Squid (band) albums
Warp (record label) albums
Albums produced by Dan Carey (record producer)